The Pontic–Caspian steppe, formed by the Caspian steppe and the Pontic steppe, is the steppeland stretching from the northern shores of the Black Sea (the Pontus Euxinus of antiquity) to the northern area around the Caspian Sea. It extends from Dobruja in the northeastern corner of Bulgaria and southeastern Romania, through Moldova and southern and eastern Ukraine, across the Russian Northern Caucasus, the Southern and lower Volga regions to western Kazakhstan, adjacent to the Kazakh steppe to the east, both forming part of the larger Eurasian Steppe. It forms a part of the Palearctic realm and of the temperate grasslands, savannas, and shrublands biome.

The area corresponds to Cimmeria, Scythia, and Sarmatia of classical antiquity. Across several millennia, numerous tribes of nomadic horsemen used the steppe; many of them went on to conquer lands in the settled regions of Europe, Western Asia, and Southern Asia.

The term Ponto-Caspian region is used in biogeography with reference to the flora and fauna of these steppes, including animals from the Black Sea, Caspian Sea, and Azov Sea. Genetic research has identified this region as the most probable place where  horses were first domesticated.

According to the most prevalent theory in Indo-European studies, the Kurgan hypothesis, the Pontic–Caspian steppe was the homeland of the speakers of the Proto-Indo-European language.

Geography and ecology

The steppe is bounded by the East European forest steppe to the north, a transitional zone of mixed grasslands and temperate broadleaf and mixed forests.

To the south, the steppe extends to the Black Sea, except the Crimean and western Caucasus mountains' border with the sea, where the Crimean Submediterranean forest complex defines the southern edge of the steppes. The steppe extends to the western shore of the Caspian Sea in the Dagestan region of Russia, but the drier Caspian lowland desert lies between the steppe and the northwestern and northern shores of the Caspian. The Kazakh Steppe bounds the steppe to the east.

The Ponto-Caspian seas are the remains of the Turgai Sea, an extension of the Paratethys which extended south and east of the Urals and covering much of today's West Siberian Plain in the Mesozoic and Cenozoic.

Prehistoric cultures

 Linear Pottery culture 5500–4500 BC
 Cucuteni-Trypillian culture 5300–2600 BC
 Khvalynsk culture 5000–3500 BC
 Sredny Stog culture 4500–3500 BC
 Maykop culture 3700–3000 BC
 Yamna/Kurgan culture 3500–2300 BC
 Kura-Araxes culture 3000–2000 BC
 Catacomb culture 3000–2200 BC
 Srubna culture 1600–1200 BC
 Koban culture 1100–400 BC
 Novocherkassk culture 900–650 BC

Historical peoples and nations

 Indo-Europeans 4th millennium BC – now
 Cimmerians 12th–7th centuries BC
 Dacians and Thracians (Getae) 11th century BC – 3rd century AD
 Scythians 8th–4th centuries BC
 Sarmatians 5th century BC – 5th century AD
 Ostrogoths 3rd–6th centuries
 Huns and Avars 4th–8th centuries
 Bulgars (Onogurs, Proto-Bulgarians), Bulgarians 4th–21st centuries:
 Great Bulgaria 7th century
 First Bulgarian Empire 7th–11th centuries
 Second Bulgarian Empire 12th–15th centuries
 Principality of Karvuna
 Alans 5th–11th centuries
 Eurasian Avars 6th–8th centuries
 Göktürks 6th–8th centuries
 Sabirs 6th–8th centuries
 Khazars 6th–11th centuries
 Magyar tribes (Hungarians) 7th–9th centuries attested but probably from earlier
 Rus' people, Kievan Rus' 8th–13th centuries
 Pechenegs 8th–11th centuries
 Kipchaks and Cumans 11th–13th centuries
 Mongol Golden Horde 13th–15th centuries
 Cossacks, Kalmyks, Crimean Khanate, Volga Tatars, Nogais and other Turkic states and tribes 15th–18th centuries
 Russian Empire 16th–20th centuries
 Mountainous Republic of the Northern Caucasus 19th–20th centuries
 Soviet Union 20th century

See also

 Forest steppe
 Indo-European migrations
 Crimean–Nogai raids into East Slavic lands
 Eurasian Steppe
 Haplogroup R1a1 (Y-DNA)
 Haplogroup R1b1 (Y-DNA)
 Kurgan hypothesis
 Late Glacial Maximum
 Steppe Route
 Tarim mummies
 Temperate grasslands, savannas, and shrublands
 Kurgan stelae

References

External links

 
 Google maps: Pontic-Caspian steppe

Central Asia
Ecoregions of Asia
Ecoregions of Bulgaria
Ecoregions of Europe
Ecoregions of Kazakhstan
Ecoregions of Moldova
Ecoregions of Romania
Ecoregions of Russia
Ecoregions of Ukraine
Eurasian Steppe

Geography of Southern Russia
Grasslands of Asia
Grasslands of Europe
Grasslands of Moldova
Grasslands of Romania
Grasslands of Russia
Grasslands of Ukraine
Iranian nomads
Natural history of Central Asia
Nomadic groups in Eurasia
North Caucasus
Palearctic ecoregions
Scythia
Temperate grasslands, savannas, and shrublands